Hurley W. Hall (born July 4, 1935) is an American politician in the state of Iowa.

Hall was born in Oxford Junction, Iowa and was an engineer for the Northwestern Bell Telephone Company as well as a farmer. He served in the Iowa House of Representatives from 1979 to 1983 and in the Iowa Senate from 1983 to 1989, as a Democrat.

References

1935 births
Living people
20th-century American politicians
People from Jones County, Iowa
Democratic Party members of the Iowa House of Representatives
Democratic Party Iowa state senators